The Scottish Reformation Parliament was the assembly commencing in 1560 that claimed to pass major pieces of legislation establishing the Scottish Reformation, most importantly the Confession of Faith Ratification Act 1560; and Papal Jurisdiction Act 1560.

Background

In 1559, John Knox returned to Scotland, marking a new effort in his battle to reform the nation. Scottish Protestants in the 1520s and 1530s were Lutherans such as Patrick Hamilton and George Wishart, who translated the First Helvetic Confession written by Heinrich Bullinger, marking the impact of the Swiss Reformation. With the return of Knox from Geneva Scottish Protestants rallied around him and the Scottish Reformation continued to be characterised by the example of  John Calvin in Geneva.

Queen dowager Mary of Guise, acting as regent for her daughter Mary, Queen of Scots, viewed the Protestants as a serious threat and felt the use of force would be necessary against them. Civil war appeared imminent, but each side shrank from the first step. Knox at once became the clerical leader of the reformers. He preached against "idolatry" with the greatest boldness, with the result that what he later called the "rascal multitude" began the "purging" of churches and the destruction of monasteries and nunneries. Mary of Guise died on 11 June 1560, at which point the youthful Mary Queen of Scots, then resident in France, gave permission, through her husband, Francis II, for Parliament to meet in her absence, but religious questions were specifically to be submitted to the 'intention and pleasure' of the king and queen.

Course
Still, in August 1560 the 'Reformation Parliament' abolished the jurisdiction of the Roman Catholic Church in Scotland with the Papal Jurisdiction Act.

A Reformed confession of faith was drafted by six ministers: John Winram, John Spottiswood, John Willock, John Douglas, John Row and John Knox. On 17 August 1560, the document was read twice, article by article, before the Parliament, and the Protestant ministers stood ready to defend "the cause of truth" if any article of belief was assailed.

When the vote was taken, the Confession was ratified and adopted. An assembly of several ministers and laymen, subsequently known as the first General Assembly of the Church of Scotland met in Edinburgh, and the First Book of Discipline (1560) was drawn up. The Second Book of Discipline (1581) was ratified much later by Parliament in 1592 (see General Assembly Act 1592). This definitely settled the Presbyterian form of polity and the Calvinistic doctrine as the recognised Protestant establishment in the country.

The Confession of Faith was established by parliament on 17 August. The Parliament also agreed on 16 August to pursue the marriage of Elizabeth I of England to James Hamilton, 3rd Earl of Arran. Randolph "never saw so important matters sooner dispatched". When the first session of the Parliament was concluded, the Duke of Châtellherault gave the Clerk Register a silver coin to have the proceedings recorded.

On 26 August the Parliament approved the Treaty of Berwick (1560), and James Stewart, Earl of Moray requested and received special confirmation that the acts of the Lords of the Congregation were lawful. The authority of the Pope in Scotland was abrogated without contradiction.

The work of the 'Reformation Parliament' was popularly acclaimed but not formally ratified until seven years later by James VI. Mary never ratified it.

Process and ceremony
The English correspondent Thomas Randolph described the ceremony surrounding the selection of the Lords of the Articles on 9 August 1560. The lords convened at Holyroodhouse then rode to the Tollbooth near St Giles. Mary, Queen of Scots was represented by the crown, mace and sword. After a speech by William Maitland, the articles of the peace with France were read and confirmed. The Lords of the Articles were chosen – these decided the agenda for the full parliament session. Then all the lords processed with the Duke to the Netherbow, and back to the Palace. The whole town wore armour, with trumpets sounding, and all other kinds of music. Randolph was confident the Lords of the Articles would commune on the "dysannullinge" of Papal authority.

See also
History of the Reformation - Knox's account of the Reformation in Scotland.
English Reformation Parliament, 1529-1536
List of parliaments of Scotland
Thomson, Thomas, ed., Acts of the Parliaments of Scotland, vol. 2, (1814)

References

1560 establishments in Scotland
Reformation Parliament, Scottish
Reformation Parliament, Scottish
Anti-Catholicism in Scotland
History of Catholicism in Scotland
Parliament
Religion and politics
1560 in politics
Church of Scotland